Brøndbyøster is a Danish town in the Brøndby Municipality, in the Region Hovedstaden.

Notable people 
 Alex Ambrose (born 1978 in Brøndbyøster) stage name Alex, is a Danish singer, songwriter and actor 
 Anton Skipper (born 2000 in Brøndbyøster) a Danish football defender who plays for Brøndby IF

References 

Copenhagen metropolitan area
Cities and towns in the Capital Region of Denmark
Brøndby Municipality